Saci may refer to:
 An alternative spelling for the Hindu goddess Sachi
 Saci (Brazilian folklore), an impish mythical character of Brazilian folk tales
 SacI, a restriction enzyme
 SACI, an art college in Florence, Italy
 Wellington Saci (born 1985), Brazilian footballer